Daniel Wood, Dan Wood or Danny Wood may refer to:

 Dan Wood (soccer) (1946–2020), collegiate and professional soccer coach, and professional golfer
 Dan Wood (broadcaster), British broadcaster, DJ, podcaster and video producer
 Dan Wood (ice hockey) (born 1962), Canadian former ice hockey player
 Daniel Joseph Wood (1849–1919), organist and chorister
 Daniel P. Wood (1819–1891), New York politician
 Danny Wood (born 1969), American musician and actor, member of New Kids on the Block
 Danny Wood, American musician, former member of ...And You Will Know Us by the Trail of Dead
 Daniel Wood (Mormon pioneer) (1800–1892), pioneer and member of the Church of Jesus Christ of Latter-day Saints (LDS Church)
 Daniel Wood (entrepreneur), American inventor

See also
 Daniel Woods (born 1989), American rock climber